The Dutch Fashion Foundation is a non-profit Dutch fashion incubator for upcoming Dutch fashion designers. It focuses on strengthening the social, economic and cultural role of Dutch fashion on a national and international level.

History
The Dutch Fashion Foundation originated out of a growing request for growth and development of a Dutch fashion climate. In 2000 Angelique Westerhof, co-founder and director of the fashion master course Fashion Institute Arnhem, observed that fashion designers who had graduated from the Fashion Institute Arnhem had difficulties presenting their collection to a wider audience, set up their own fashion labels and find a connection with the fashion industry on their own. She established the Dutch Fashion Foundation in 2001 to develop the status of a collective Dutch fashion discipline.

In May 2003, the Dutch Fashion Foundation was officially introduced after being a silent corporation for two years. The Dutch Fashion Foundation is the initiator and organiser of the annual Dutch Fashion Awards and the international campaign Dutch Touch.

References

External links
How To Dress Like Y2K
Festival Outfits For Men & Women
Tips For Launching A Career In Fashion

Fashion organizations
Trade associations based in the Netherlands